A by-election was held for the New South Wales Legislative Assembly electorate of Goldfields North on 23 February 1870 because Robert Wisdom had also been elected to Lower Hunter and chose to resign from Goldfields North.

Dates

Result

Robert Wisdom was also elected to Lower Hunter and chose to resign from Goldfields North.

See also
Electoral results for the district of Goldfields North
List of New South Wales state by-elections

References

1870 elections in Australia
New South Wales state by-elections
1870s in New South Wales